The Ministry of Finance of the Republic of Belarus is the Belarusian government ministry which coordinates state financial policy and oversees the regulation of securities in Belarus.

The current Minister of Finance is Yuri Seliverstov.

History 
In 2006 it was merged with the Securities Committee of the Council of Ministers, which is now a department under the Ministry.

Ministers of Finance 
Stepan Yanchuk, (1991-1994)
Nikolay Rumas, (1994-1995)
Pawl Dzik, (1995-1997)
Nikolai Korbut, (1997-2008)
Andrey Kharkovets, (2008-2014)
Vladimir Amarin, (2014-2018)
Maksim Yermalovich, (2018-2020)
Yuri Seliverstov, (since 5 June 2020)

References 

Government ministries of Belarus
Finance